Seguenzia textilis is a species of extremely small deep water sea snail, a marine gastropod mollusk in the family Seguenziidae.

Description
The height of this translucent, nacreous, white shell attains 3.5 mm.

Distribution
This marine species occurs off New Zealand in the Tasman Basin and off the Aldermen Islands at depths between 570 m  and 846 m.

References

 Marshall, B.A. 1983: Recent and Tertiary Seguenziidae (Mollusca: Gastropoda) from the New Zealand region. New Zealand Journal of Zoology 10: 235-262

External links
 To Encyclopedia of Life
 To World Register of Marine Species

textilis
Gastropods described in 1983